Amastra micans is a species of land snail, a terrestrial pulmonate gastropod mollusk in the family Amastridae. This species is endemic to Hawaii.

References

Molluscs of Hawaii
Amastra
Gastropods described in 1859
Taxonomy articles created by Polbot